Dink is a village in Southern Bulgaria, Maritsa Municipality, Plovdiv Province. As of 15th of June 2020, the village has a population count of 909.

Geography 
Dink is located in the Upper Thracian Plain, 16 kilometers southeast of Plovdiv, at an elevation between 100 and 199 meters above sea level. The village has a land area of 588,3 ha and has a bus line that reaches Plovdiv.

History 
During the years of Ottoman rule in Bulgaria, in Dink there were several Armenian Farms, built around 1850. There was a farm near the river, named "Dinkata", hence later the name of the village became "Dink".

Infrastructure 
There is a church in Dink, named "Uspenie Bogorodichno". It was destroyed in the 1928 Chirpan–Plovdiv earthquakes. Later it was rebuilt.

The first school in the village was established in 1905 in a private edifice. It remained functioning until 1912 - 1913, when it became governmental owned. It was built with community funds and was later destroyed during the massive earthquake in 1928. In 1929 it was rebuilt and named "Paisii Hilendarski" or "Otets Paisii".

The village also has a community hall and library named "Prosveta", which was built in 1938 and rebuilt in 2007.

In the center of the village a monument of a slain antifascist can be found.

References 

Villages in Maritsa Municipality